Diarmuid Costello is a British philosopher and Professor of Philosophy at the University of Warwick. He is known for his works on aesthetics and the philosophy of art.
Costello chaired the British Society of Aesthetics executive committee and was a Leverhulme Senior Research Fellow.

Books
 On Photography: A Philosophical Inquiry, Routledge, 2017
 The Life and Death of Images: Ethics and Aesthetics, Co-edited with Dominic Willsdon, Tate Publishing and Cornell UP, 2008

References

External links
Diarmuid Costello at the University of Warwick

21st-century British philosophers
Continental philosophers
Philosophy academics
Living people
Academics of the University of Warwick
Alumni of the University of Essex
Analytic philosophers
Philosophers of art
Year of birth missing (living people)
Place of birth missing (living people)